Scott Christopher Grimes (born July 9, 1971) is an American actor and singer. Some of his most prominent roles include appearances in the 1984 cult classic The Night They Saved Christmas, ER as Dr. Archie Morris, Party of Five as Will McCorkle, Band of Brothers as Technical Sergeant Donald Malarkey, and the animated sitcom American Dad!, voicing Steve Smith. He is also well known by cult movie fans for his role as Bradley Brown in the first two Critters films. Since 2017, he has been a regular on the Fox/Hulu sci-fi comedy drama The Orville as Gordon Malloy.

As a singer, Grimes is best known for co-writing and performing the soft rock single "Sunset Blvd", which spent several weeks on the Billboard charts, and for being one of the four singers in Russell Crowe's band Indoor Garden Party.

Early life 
Grimes was born in Lowell, Massachusetts, the son of Pam and Rick Grimes. He lived in Albuquerque, New Mexico until he was 10, when he moved to Dracut and attended Dracut Public Schools. His sister, Heather Grimes, is also an actress. He is the uncle of Camryn Grimes, who is known for her roles as Cassie Newman and Mariah Copeland on The Young and the Restless.

Career
Grimes started acting at an early age. In 1984, at the age of 13, he co-starred with Mickey Rooney in a made-for-TV holiday movie titled It Came Upon the Midnight Clear. In 1985, he appeared in an episode of the Twilight Zone called "Little Boy Lost."

Grimes also began singing in childhood, and in March 1986 appeared on a Bob Hope TV special, singing "Somewhere Over The Rainbow." The special was taped in Sweden with the King and Queen in attendance. In 1987, he performed as a guest vocalist on the Time album by Richard Carpenter of The Carpenters, where Carpenter thanked the 15-year-old Grimes for his "spirited" performance, commenting in the liner notes, "I believe young Scott to have quite a future in music." Grimes' first music album, Scott Grimes. was released by A&M Records in 1989,  with the single "I Don't Even Mind" and produced by Carpenter. In 2005, he released his second album, Livin' on the Run, and in 2010 his third, Drive.

In 1987, Grimes voiced Pinocchio in the dark animated film Pinocchio and the Emperor of the Night. In 1988, he appeared with Dwayne Hickman, Connie Stevens, and her daughter Tricia Leigh Fisher in the TV movie Bring Me the Head of Dobie Gillis; Grimes, Hickman, Stevens, and Fisher also appeared on the All-Star Super Password Special with Bert Convy. He had also guest starred on the NBC sitcom Wings. He is also known for his 1987 recurring role on Who's the Boss as Alyssa Milano's character's love interest, Chad McCann and his regular appearances in the 1994–2000 series Party of Five as Will McCorkle.

Grimes starred as Sargent Donald Malarky in the HBO mini series “Band of Brothers” in 2001

Grimes starred on the NBC series ER playing Dr. Archie Morris from 2003 until the series' end in 2009. Initially a recurring character on ER, he later was upgraded to a main role in season 12. The character initially provided comic relief, but grew over the years, becoming central to several episodes and story lines in the series' final seasons.

Since 2005, Grimes has voiced Steve Smith in the American animated sitcom American Dad! He has also voiced the recurring characters Midget Assassin and Frat Guy, as well as several additional characters, each of whom appear in only one episode.

Grimes' film credits include the dark comedy Who's Your Monkey and Ridley Scott's Robin Hood with Russell Crowe and Cate Blanchett. On October 11, 2010, Grimes announced on his Twitter that he would voice a character on the animated series Family Guy, which would turn out to be Joe Swanson's previously thought-to-be-dead son, Kevin Swanson. On March 19, 2013, he was cast as Dave Flynn on the NCIS: Los Angeles episode entitled Red, the first episode of a two-part backdoor pilot to another NCIS spin-off which would have been named NCIS: Red, but it was not picked up. Grimes had previously appeared in an NCIS episode entitled "Baltimore" in 2011 as Detective Danny Price, Anthony DiNozzo's former partner at the Baltimore P.D.

Since September 10, 2017, he has played cocky helmsman Gordon Malloy, the best friend of Captain Ed Mercer (Seth MacFarlane) on the Fox/Hulu sci-fi comedy drama The Orville, created by executive producer MacFarlane.

Personal life
Grimes has a son and a daughter with his first wife, Dawn Bailey-Grimes, whom he married on May 5, 1997. In December 2011, he married Megan Moore. She filed for divorce in October 2017. At the San Diego Comic-Con in 2018, it was revealed that he was dating his Orville co-star Adrianne Palicki. The two announced their engagement in January 2019, and married in Austin, Texas on May 19, 2019. Two months later, in July 2019, Palicki filed for divorce, but had it dismissed in November. The couple separated again in June 2020, with Palicki again filing for divorce in July.

Filmography

Film

Television

Video Games

Discography

Albums
1989: Scott Grimes (A&M/PolyGram)
2005: Livin' on the Run 
2010: Drive

Singles

References

External links

 
 INTERVIEW: Robin Hood's Merry Men | Rip It Up Magazine

1971 births
Living people
20th-century American male actors
20th-century American singers
21st-century American male actors
21st-century American singers
A&M Records artists
Actors from Lowell, Massachusetts
American male child actors
American male film actors
American male singers
American male television actors
American male voice actors
Male actors from Massachusetts
Musicians from Lowell, Massachusetts
People from Dracut, Massachusetts
People from Lowell, Massachusetts
Singers from Massachusetts